Komaravolu Chandrasekharan (21 November 1920 – 13 April 2017)
was a professor at ETH Zurich and a founding faculty member of School of Mathematics, Tata Institute of Fundamental Research (TIFR). He is known for his work in number theory and summability. He received the Padma Shri, the Shanti Swarup Bhatnagar Award, and the Ramanujan Medal, and he was an honorary fellow of TIFR. He was president of the International Mathematical Union (IMU) from 1971 to 1974.

Biography
Chandrasekharan was born on 21 November 1920 in Machilipatnam, Andhra Pradesh. Chandrasekharan completed his high school from Bapatla village in Guntur from Andhra Pradesh. He completed M.A. in mathematics from the Presidency College, Chennai and a PhD from the Department of Mathematics, University of Madras in 1942, under the supervision of K. Ananda Rau.

When Chandrasekharan was with the Institute for Advanced Study, Princeton, US, Homi Bhabha invited Chandrashekharan to join the School of Mathematics of the Tata Institute of Fundamental Research (TIFR). Chandrashekharan persuaded mathematicians L. Schwarz, C. L. Siegel and others from all over the world to visit TIFR and deliver lectures. In 1965, Chandrasekharan left the Tata Institute of Fundamental Research to join the ETH Zurich, where he retired in 1988.

He was a fellow of the American Mathematical Society.

Selected works
with Salomon Bochner: 
with S. Minakshisundaram: 
 reprinting 2012

Notes

References
 – India's who is who

External links
 

20th-century Indian mathematicians
Telugu people
People from Andhra Pradesh
Recipients of the Padma Shri in literature & education
Indian number theorists
Mathematical analysts
Academic staff of ETH Zurich
Fellows of the American Mathematical Society
1920 births
2017 deaths
University of Madras alumni
21st-century Indian mathematicians
People from Guntur district
Scientists from Andhra Pradesh
Recipients of the Shanti Swarup Bhatnagar Award in Mathematical Science
Indian emigrants to Switzerland
Presidents of the International Mathematical Union